Stefansson Strait is an ice-filled strait 35 nautical miles (60 km) long and 3 to 10 nautical miles (18 km) wide, between the east coast of Palmer Land, there called Wilkins Coast, and Hearst Island. This strait was first sighted by Sir Hubert Wilkins at the south end of his flight of December 20, 1928, and was named by him for Vilhjalmur Stefansson. He believed it to be a strait cutting off what is now known to be Antarctic Peninsula from the main land mass of Antarctica. The true orientation of the strait was determined by members of the United States Antarctic Service (USAS) who charted this coast by land and from the air in 1940.

Straits of Antarctica
Bodies of water of Palmer Land